Noumeaella is a genus of sea slugs, specifically of aeolid nudibranchs.

Species
Species in this genus include:
 Noumeaella africana Edmunds, 1970
 Noumeaella curiosa Risbec, 1937
 Noumeaella isa Ev. Marcus & Er. Marcus, 1970
 Noumeaella kristenseni (Ev. Marcus & Er. Marcus, 1963)
 Noumeaella rehderi Marcus, 1965
 Noumeaella rubrofasciata Gosliner, 1991

References

External links
 Risbec J. (1937) Note Préliminaire au sujet de Nudibranches Néo-Calédoniens. Bulletin du Muséum national d´Histoire naturelle series 2, 9: 159-164

Facelinidae